The 2019–20 season is Huracán's 7th consecutive season in the top division of Argentine football. In addition to the Primera División, the club are competing in the Copa Argentina, Copa de la Superliga and Copa Sudamericana.

The season generally covers the period from 1 July 2019 to 30 June 2020.

Review

Pre-season
On 8 June 2019, young forward Leandro Paradiso was released by Huracán; who claimed he had underperformed in their academy, this drew criticism from fans and the player himself. Omar Alderete was the club's first senior outgoing of the transfer market, with the centre-back completing a move to Swiss football with Basel on 11 June. Adrián Calello was their first reinforcement of 2019–20, as the defensive midfielder returned to the club after a one-season stint away with Banfield. Leonel Müller agreed his departure from Huracán on 20 June to Defensores de Belgrano, with Manuel Falón also leaving to go to Sacachispas. On 21 June, defensive duo Christian Chimino and Federico Mancinelli made it four departing players after penning terms with domestic rivals Patronato.

Israel Damonte was signed by fellow top-flight team Banfield on 24 June. Huracán played their first pre-season fixtures on 26 June, subsequently experiencing a three-goal victory and a one-goal defeat at the Estadio Tomás Adolfo Ducó to Argentinos Juniors. Forward Tomás Molina was allowed to leave hours later, signing a deal with Brown. Globo penned a contract with Gonzalo Bettini from Rosario Central on 27 June. Numerous loans from the previous campaign officially expired on 30 June. Rodrigo Gómez was loaned in from Liga MX's Toluca on 1 July. Juan Pablo Vojvoda's team made a further transaction on 2 July, as the club secured terms with Gimnasia y Esgrima's Lorenzo Faravelli. Huracán failed to beat Defensa y Justicia in two friendlies on 3 July.

Fernando Pellegrino, who had left on 30 June following the expiration of his temporary contract, rejoined Huracán on a fresh season-long loan deal on 5 July. On the same day, Racing Club duo Mariano Bareiro and Martín Ojeda also came in on loan. A win and a draw arrived in friendlies with Ferro Carril Oeste on 6 July. Bareiro scored on his non-competitive debut on 10 July, gaining his new side a victory in a friendly with Atlanta; in an encounter which followed a goalless draw between the two.

July
Huracán met Godoy Cruz in the Copa Argentina round of thirty-two on 14 July at the Estadio Presidente Perón, they'd subsequently exit the competition on penalties following a 1–1 draw; as they missed four of their five spot-kicks. Right-back Pablo Álvarez was allowed to train with Arsenal de Sarandí on 19 July, ahead of a potential move. During the succeeding twenty-four hours, the club played Vélez Sarsfield in pre-season friendlies; ending the day with a win apiece. Pablo Álvarez headed off to Arsenal de Sarandí on 22 July. Fernando Cosciuc departed on loan to Brown on 23 July. Huracán held Boca Juniors to a goalless draw at La Bombonera on 29 July, in their first fixture of the 2019–20 campaign.

August
Lucas Gamba was transferred to Rosario Central on 1 August, as the centre-forward penned for three years. Juan Ignacio Vieyra and Joaquín Arzura (loan) became reinforcements for Huracán on 1 August, as they came from Nacional and River Plate respectively. Huracán met Colón in match two in the Primera División on 2 August, defeating the Santa Fe outfit two-nil. A Lucas Barrios penalty gave Huracán victory in a friendly over Defensores de Belgrano on 10 August. Alex Sosa departed Huracán on 14 August, joining Brown. On 15 August, Patricio Toranzo joined Almagro while Federico Marín (loan) and Juan Ignacio Sills went to Defensores de Belgrano and Instituto. In their second league fixture away from home, Huracán lost 2–1 to Patronato.

Huracán's second scoreless tie in the Primera División came on 26 August, as they shared the points with Argentinos Juniors. 30 August saw Diego Mendoza leave on loan, signing with Ibiza of Spain's 2019–20 Segunda División B.

September
Huracán lost their second successive away game on 1 September to Newell's Old Boys, who put four past them at the Estadio Marcelo Bielsa.

Squad

Transfers
Domestic transfer windows:3 July 2019 to 24 September 201920 January 2020 to 19 February 2020.

Transfers in

Transfers out

Loans in

Loans out

Friendlies

Pre-season
Ferro Carril Oeste announced a friendly with Huracán on 17 June 2019, with the encounter to be played at the Estadio Tomás Adolfo Ducó on 6 July. They themselves revealed a pre-season fixture on 21 July, as Argentinos Juniors were set to visit their stadium for a double-header on 26 June. Atlanta of Primera B Nacional penciled in a friendly with Huracán on 24 June for 10 July. Games with Defensa y Justicia was scheduled for 3 July on 27 June.

Mid-season
A match with Platense was initially scheduled before being cancelled. They'd also meet Vélez Sarsfield on 20 July and Defensores de Belgrano on 10 August.

Competitions

Primera División

League table

Relegation table

Source: AFA

Results summary

Matches
The fixtures for the 2019–20 campaign were released on 10 July.

Copa Argentina

Huracán were drawn with fellow Primera División team Godoy Cruz in the Copa Argentina round of thirty-two, with the fixture set to take place on 14 July 2019 in Córdoba at the Estadio Presidente Perón; a neutral venue, as is customary in the competition.

Copa de la Superliga

Copa Sudamericana

Squad statistics

Appearances and goals

Statistics accurate as of 2 September 2019.

Goalscorers

Notes

References

Club Atlético Huracán seasons
Huracán